Oscar Luigi Fraulo (born 6 December 2003) is a Danish professional footballer who plays as a midfielder for Bundesliga club Borussia Mönchengladbach.

History 
Fraulo was born in Odense, Denmark to a family of Italian ancestry. He began playing football at an early age for OKS, before moving to the Midtjylland academy at age 13.

Club career 

Fraulo made his professional debut for Midtjylland on 10 August 2021, coming on as a substitute during the Champions League qualifying 1-0 home defeat against PSV Eindhoven, that saw the Danish club losing on aggregate, and therefore entering the Europa League.

On 24 June 2022, Fraulo signed a four-year contract with Bundesliga club Borussia Mönchengladbach.

References

External links

2003 births
Living people
Danish men's footballers
Denmark youth international footballers
Association football midfielders
FC Midtjylland players
Borussia Mönchengladbach players
Danish Superliga players
Footballers from Odense
Odense Kammeraternes Sportsklub players
Danish people of Italian descent
Danish expatriate men's footballers
Expatriate footballers in Germany
Danish expatriate sportspeople in Germany